The post-Soviet, Russian socialist political Party of Peace and Unity under the leadership of Sazhi Umalatova issued a number of orders, decorations and medals on the behalf of the unregistered NGO "Permanent Presidium of the Congress of People's Deputies of the Soviet Union" (ППСНД СССР, PPSND). Some were original or reminted Soviet awards, others were new but retained the communist aesthetics dating to before the dissolution of the USSR.

The awards listed below were issued between 1994 and 2010, they are commonly called "Umalatova awards" after the party leader.

Post-Soviet Union Umalatova "Awards"

"Orders"

"Medals"

References

See also
Orders, decorations, and medals of the Soviet Union
List of orders, decorations, and medals of the Russian Federation
Party of Peace and Unity
List of political parties in Russia

Orders, decorations, and medals of Russia
Politics awards